Shannon McIntosh is an American film producer. She is a recipient of the Golden Globe Award for Best Motion Picture – Musical or Comedy for producing Once Upon a Time in Hollywood.

Filmography

Films

 Grindhouse (2007) — executive producer
 Death Proof (2007) — executive producer
 Django Unchained (2012) — executive producer
 Angels Sing (2012) — producer
 Tusk (2014) — producer
 The Hateful Eight (2015) — producer
 Meet the Blacks (2016) — producer
 Once Upon a Time in Hollywood (2019) — producer
 The House Next Door (2021) – producer
 Cinderella (2021) – producer

References

External links
 

Living people
American film producers
Golden Globe Award-winning producers
Year of birth missing (living people)